Merthyr Tydfil bus station is the bus station that serves the town of Merthyr Tydfil, South Wales.

There are 14 stands and the main operator at the station is Stagecoach South Wales. NAT Group and First Call Travel also run services from Merthyr Tydfil bus station. The former bus station closed and was demolished for development.

History

The original bus station dates from the 1960s, designed with two curving sections to give direct access to the adjacent modern shopping centre development. The former bus station closed on 11 June 2021 for demolition.

New station
In 2014 proposals were put forward for an alternative site to the south of the town centre at Swan Street, closer to the railway station. The town council described the design of the old site as problematic and "a location of high levels of anti-social behaviour and crime". In January 2015 the old police station and former Hollies health centre buildings at Swan Street was demolished and in August the plans for the new bus station on the site were released. Construction of the new bus station was dependent on funding from the Welsh Government. The Welsh Government has committed the funding, and the construction has started on 15 July 2019 and was finished within 91 weeks. The new Interchange opened on 13 June 2021. In June 2021, a time lapse video showing the completion of the works was released.

Rail link

Merthyr Tydfil railway station is a four-minute walk from the bus station. From here, users can transfer to Transport for Wales services to Bridgend, Queen Street, Cardiff Central, and Barry, via the Merthyr line

See also
Transport in Wales
List of bus stations in Wales

References

External links

Bus stations in Wales
Transport in Merthyr Tydfil